is a Japanese anime screenwriter. He debuted in 1997 and has worked on numerous series since, including Black Clover, That Time I Got Reincarnated as a Slime, and By the Grace of the Gods. Fudeyasu usually spells his name with kanji. However, he will also credit his name in hiragana on some occasions.

Works

TV series

Films

Web series

References

External links
 
 

Anime screenwriters
Japanese screenwriters
Living people
Year of birth missing (living people)